Ibala is a genus of African ground spiders that was first described by M. J. FitzPatrick in 2009.

Species
 it contains seventeen species:
Ibala arcus (Tucker, 1923) (type) – Zimbabwe, South Africa
Ibala bilinearis (Tucker, 1923) – South Africa
Ibala bulawayensis (Tucker, 1923) – Zimbabwe, South Africa
Ibala declani Fitzpatrick, 2009 – Zimbabwe
Ibala gonono Fitzpatrick, 2009 – Zimbabwe
Ibala hessei (Lawrence, 1928) – Namibia
Ibala isikela Fitzpatrick, 2009 – Zambia, Zimbabwe
Ibala kaokoensis (Lawrence, 1928) – Namibia
Ibala kevini Fitzpatrick, 2009 – Zimbabwe
Ibala kylae Fitzpatrick, 2009 – Zimbabwe
Ibala lapidaria (Lawrence, 1928) – Namibia
Ibala mabalauta Fitzpatrick, 2009 – Zimbabwe
Ibala minshullae Fitzpatrick, 2009 – Zimbabwe
Ibala okorosave Fitzpatrick, 2009 – Namibia
Ibala omuramba (Lawrence, 1927) – Namibia
Ibala quadrativulva (Lawrence, 1927) – Namibia
Ibala robinsoni Fitzpatrick, 2009 – Zimbabwe, Botswana

References

Araneomorphae genera
Gnaphosidae
Spiders of Africa